Hell ("Bright") is the thirteenth full-length studio album by German rock band Die Ärzte. It was released on 23 October 2020.

Track listing
Track listing adapted from Tidal.

Charts

Weekly charts

Year-end charts

References

2020 albums
Die Ärzte albums
German-language albums